Liz Henry (born 1969) is a blogger, author, translator, technologist, and activist. She is a co-founder of the first women's hackerspace in San Francisco, Double Union, where she is still active. She is also an advocate for disability technology and hacking existing technology for use by disabled people.

Career 

Henry is a senior release manager at Twitch. Previously, she was the Firefox release manager and bugmaster for Mozilla. She has also served on the advisory board of the GimpGirl Community and The Ada Initiative. In 2005, in the aftermath of Hurricane Katrina, Henry flew to Houston to help the evacuees. She worked with Technology For All to help people use technology to reconnect and rebuild.

In 2007, Henry co-organized BarCampBlock in Palo Alto, California.

In 2011, Henry played a key role in the unveiling of A Gay Girl In Damascus. She questioned whether the purported writer of the blog, Amina Arraf, actually existed.

In 2012, Aqueduct Press published a book of her poems, Unruly Islands.  Henry also edited The WisCon Chronicles: Vol. 3: The Carnival of Feminist SF , the third of a series of anthologies of articles about, or inspired by, the feminist science fiction convention WisCon, held every year in Madison, Wisconsin.

In 2017, Cardboard House Press published her translation of Chilean poet and writer Carmen Berenguer's book My Lai.

Personal life 

Henry and Danny O'Brien got married in October 2018.

See also

References 

1969 births
American women bloggers
American bloggers
American disability rights activists
Free software programmers
American LGBT writers
Living people
Mozilla developers
Place of birth missing (living people)
Mozilla people
Open source people
People from San Francisco
Activists from California
21st-century American women